The men's finweight is a competition featured at the 2022 World Taekwondo Championships, and was held at the Centro Acuático CODE Metropolitano in Guadalajara, Mexico on 19 November 2022. Finweights were limited to a maximum of 54 kilograms in body mass.

Results
Legend
DQ — Won by disqualification
P — Won by punitive declaration

Finals

Top half

Section 1

Section 2

Bottom half

Section 3

Section 4

References

External links
Draw

Men's 54